Holm is a small village area in Dyrøy Municipality in Troms og Finnmark county, Norway.  It is located in the central part of the eastern coast of the island of Dyrøya.  Dyrøy Church is located in Holm.

References

Dyrøy
Villages in Troms